Andrea Kiss (born 7 November 1995) is a Hungarian ice hockey player and coach, currently playing in the European Women's Hockey League (EWHL) with the women's team of MAC Budapest and serving as head coach to MAC Marilyn Budapest in the Austrian Women's Ice Hockey Bundesliga (DEBL). During her career with the Hungarian national ice hockey team, which spanned from 2011 to 2021, she participated in nine IIHF Women's World Championship tournaments, including the Top Division tournament in 2021.

Career statistics

International

Source(s):

References

External links
 

1996 births
Living people
Expatriate ice hockey players in Switzerland
Hungarian ice hockey coaches
Hungarian women's ice hockey forwards
KMH Budapest (women) players
MAC Budapest (women) players
European Women's Hockey League players
Hungarian expatriate ice hockey people
Hungarian expatriate sportspeople in Switzerland